The Connors–Lendl rivalry was a tennis rivalry between Jimmy Connors and Ivan Lendl. They met 35 times, with the head-to-head finishing at 22-13, favoring Lendl. Their rivalry transitioned significantly over time: Connors (who is 7 and a half years older than Lendl) won their first 8 matches, while Lendl won the last 17.

Lendl and Connors were both number ones and Grand Slam winners with each winning eight Grand Slam titles. At Grand Slams they met seven times, with Lendl winning the final four meetings and Connors winning the first three. The rivalry between the two, as well as their rivalries with fellow tennis player John McEnroe, have been described as "spikey."

The rivalry was first noted in the 1982 US Open final when Connors dared Lendl to drive the ball past him. Connors subsequently won the final in four sets. In the rematch in 1983, Connors was rushed to the locker room late in the second set before coming back out to defeat Lendl once again in four sets. The final match between the two was also at the US Open, in 1992, where Connors led for a set and a half before falling to his 17th defeat in 8 years to Lendl.

Head-to-head

Official matches (35)

Connors 13 – Lendl 22

Note: The ABD 1984 Rotterdam final with Lendl leading 6-0, 1-0,  was abandoned due to a bomb scare. There was no result.

Head-to-head breakdown
 All matches: (35)  Lendl 22–13
 All finals: (7)* Connors 4–2 ,  *(1 No Result)
Grand Slam matches: Lendl 4–3
 Grand Slam finals: Connors 2–0
 Masters matches: Lendl 4–1
 WCT Finals matches: tied 1–1
 Clay court matches: tied 2–2 
 Grass court  matches: Connors 2–0
 Hard court matches: Lendl 14–5
 Indoor carpet matches: Lendl 6–4

Other matches

Invitational matches

Connors–Lendl (3–8)

ATP rankings 

Note: Connors was active in 1970–1972, but the ATP rankings started in 1973.

Year-end ranking timeline

ATP Year-end ranking timeline by age
Age at end of season

See also
 Connors–McEnroe rivalry
 Lendl–McEnroe rivalry

References

External links
 ATP Connors vs Lendl Head to Head

Jimmy Connors
Tennis rivalries
Sports rivalries in the United States